A Gentleman of Leisure is a surviving 1915 American silent comedy film produced by Jesse Lasky and distributed by Paramount Pictures. It stars stage veteran Wallace Eddinger. The film is based on the 1910 novel A Gentleman of Leisure by P. G. Wodehouse and 1911 Broadway play adapted by Wodehouse and John Stapleton. Douglas Fairbanks was a cast member in the play several years before beginning a film career. This film survives in the Library of Congress.

Plot

Robert Edgar Willoughby Pitt embarks on a steamship leaving London for New York. However, First Class is full and Robert is forced to travel with the emigrants on the lower deck, from where, by regulation, he cannot access the upper one.  The beautiful Molly Creedon is traveling in First Class and Robert, in order to woo the girl, encounters many difficulties precisely because of the restrictions with which he has to comply.

Arriving in New York, Robert heads to his exclusive club, where he bets that he could rob a house and avoid being arrested.  Later, when Spike Mullins tries to rob him, Robert prevents him, but offers to team up on the caper.  Spike suggests robbing the home of a deputy police commissioner known for taking bribes. The man, "Big Phil" Creedon, is Molly's father. Molly catches the thieves and "Big Phil" accepts a bribe to let them go, but warns Robert to keep away from Molly.  Spike, who has become Robert's servant, steals a pearl necklace during a house party.  To save him from arrest, Robert threatens to report Creedon's embezzlement.  Molly discreetly returns the pearls, while Creedon accepts the deal, promising not to take any more bribes.

Cast
 Wallace Eddinger as Robert Edgar Willoughby Pitt
 Sydney Deane as Sir Thomas Pitt
 Gertrude Kellar as Lady Julia Blunt
 Tom Forman as Sir Spencer Dreever
 Carol Holloway as Molly Creedon
 Fred Montague as 'Big Phil' Creedon (as Frederick Montague)
 William Elmer as Spike Mullins (as Billy Elmer)
 Frederick Vroom as Macklin, Pitt's Friend
 Francis Tyler as Willett, Pitt's Friend
 Monroe Salisbury as Stutten, Pitt's Friend
 Mr. Machin as Fuller, Pitt's Friend
 Florence Dagmar as Kate
 Lawrence Peyton as Ole Larsen (as Larry Peyton)
 Robert Dunbar as Jeweler
 Lucien Littlefield as Clerk

Production
The film was produced by the Jesse L. Lasky Feature Play Company. Originally, Henry Woodruff was set to star in the film, but fell ill shortly after production began.  He was replaced by Eddinger.

See also
A Gentleman of Leisure (1923)

References

External links

 
 
  Famous Players Herald layout

1915 films
American silent feature films
American films based on plays
Films based on works by P. G. Wodehouse
Films directed by George Melford
Paramount Pictures films
1915 comedy films
American black-and-white films
Silent American comedy films
1910s American films